The United States Avenue Trail is a multi-use trail in Camden County, New Jersey,
and is part of the Gibbsboro Greenway collection of trails. The United States Avenue Trail is
also known as the Green Trail within the Greenway collection. The trail's current length
The name of the trail is derived from the roadway which it parallels.

The trail runs between Foster Avenue in Gibbsboro, New Jersey and Egg Harbor Road in Lindenwold, New Jersey.

History 
The bike way runs along South
United States Avenue on the right-of-way of a railway corridor abandoned in 1978 when the Sherwin-Williams
paint factory closed. The rail corridor was originally part of the Camden and Atlantic Railroad,
that was eventually incorporated into the Pennsylvania Railroad, and ultimately into
Conrail before its abandonment.

The railway was originally installed to bring workers to Gibbsboro from nearby Lucaston
by horse drawn rail carriage.

References 

Bike paths in New Jersey
Gibbsboro, New Jersey
Rail trails in New Jersey
Transportation in Camden County, New Jersey